The 1927 Grand National was the 86th renewal of the Grand National horse race that took place at Aintree near Liverpool, England, on 25 March 1927.

The race was won by Sprig, the 8/1 favourite ridden by jockey Ted Leader. Leader's father, Tom, trained the winner. It was Sprig's third attempt at winning the National — his owner, Mary Partridge, having kept him in training in memory of her son who died in World War I.

At Becher's Brook on the first circuit, Marsin and Lissett III fell and Silver Somme — a popular fancy — refused. Bovril III, a 100/1 outsider, finished in second place by one length, with Bright's Boy another length behind in third.

This was the first National to be covered on BBC Radio.

Finishing order

Non-finishers

References

 1927
Grand National
Grand National
20th century in Lancashire